Panče Ḱumbev (born 25 December 1979) is a Macedonian retired footballer who last played for FK Rabotnički.

International career
He made his senior debut for Macedonia in a February 2003 friendly match against Croatia and has earned a total of 9 caps, scoring no goals. His final international was a June 2004 friendly against Estonia.

Achievements 
FK Pobeda Prilep
Macedonian Cup: 1
Winner: 2002
FC Dyskobolia Grodzisk Wielkopolski
Polish Cup: 1
Winner: 2005
FC Legia Warszawa
Ekstraklasa: 1
Runner-up: 2009

Notes

References

External links
 
 Profile at MacedonianFootball 
 

1979 births
Living people
Sportspeople from Veles, North Macedonia
Association football defenders
Macedonian footballers
North Macedonia international footballers
FK Borec players
FK Pobeda players
Dyskobolia Grodzisk Wielkopolski players
Obra Kościan players
Legia Warsaw players
FK Rabotnički players
Macedonian First Football League players
Ekstraklasa players
Macedonian expatriate footballers
Expatriate footballers in Poland
Macedonian expatriate sportspeople in Poland